Guido Figone (13 October 1927 – 24 November 1998) was an Italian gymnast. He competed at the 1948 Summer Olympics and the 1952 Summer Olympics.

References

External links
 

1927 births
1998 deaths
Italian male artistic gymnasts
Olympic gymnasts of Italy
Gymnasts at the 1948 Summer Olympics
Gymnasts at the 1952 Summer Olympics
People from Chiavari
Sportspeople from the Province of Genoa
20th-century Italian people